Mettler & Salz was a Swiss publishing house. It was founded in the 20th century by Mettler and Georges Salz, and was based in Tscharnerstrasse 14 a in Bern. It contributed to spread freethought in Switzerland during the Interwar period and World War II by publishing mainly novels, monographs and scientific literature.

Publishing program 

As an academic publisher, Mettler & Salz was specialized in humanities natural sciences. The publishing house also served Georges Salz as a self-publishing house for his travel literature. Mettler & Salz published during 18 years the organ of the Freethinkers Association of Switzerland. It published specialized freethought books by Leo Heinrich Skrbensky and Ernst Akert, and with Hans Moehrlen's novel Between Two Worlds (1942) it also published fictional literature.

References

External links 

 Complete historical publication of the member magazine of the Freethinkers Association of Switzerland, including the editions of the 1920s, 1930sand 1940s by Mettler & Salz, and digitalised by the Swiss National Library.

Freethought
Publishing companies established in the 20th century
Academic publishing companies
Publishing companies of Switzerland
Companies based in Bern
Mass media in Bern